National Lampoon's Vacation film series is a comedy film series initially based on John Hughes' short story "Vacation '58" that was originally published by National Lampoon magazine. The series is distributed by Warner Bros. and consists of five main films, two of which are not sponsored by National Lampoon, and one spin-off. In recent years, the series has been the inspiration for various advertising campaigns featuring some of the original cast members. The series portrays the misadventures of the Griswold family, whose attempts to enjoy vacations and holidays are plagued with continual disasters and strangely embarrassing predicaments.

Films

Original series

National Lampoon's Vacation (1983)

National Lampoon's Vacation was directed by Harold Ramis and written by John Hughes. The film follows Clark and Ellen Griswold as they take their two children, Rusty and Audrey, on a cross-country trip from their home in Chicago, to the California theme park Walley World. Planned out by Clark, the trip begins to go awry after the family gets lost in St. Louis. From there, they make it to Coolidge, Kansas, where they spend the night at the home of Ellen's cousin Catherine and husband Eddie. There they are forced to take Ellen's Aunt Edna and her dog to Phoenix, Arizona. Along the way to there, Clark accidentally drags the dog from the back of the car and Edna dies during a long day of driving. Dropping her body off at cousin Normy's house in Phoenix, they eventually make it to Walley World only to find that it is closed, causing Clark to take matters into his own hands.

National Lampoon's European Vacation (1985)

National Lampoon's European Vacation was directed by Amy Heckerling and written by John Hughes and Robert Klane. After becoming the winning family on a game show called "Pig In A Poke", the Griswolds win a two-week trip to Europe. The vacation begins in London, where they visit sights such as Big Ben, Houses of Parliament and Buckingham Palace. Having trouble with driving on the left side of the road, Clark ends up in many accidents and unknowingly knocks down Stonehenge. From there they stop in France, where their camcorder gets stolen; in West Germany, where they spend the night at the home of strangers they mistake for their relatives; and in Italy, where they become involved with a thief's robbery and kidnapping. In addition, they also have many run-ins with a bicycle rider.

This is the first of two Vacation films to not feature the Randy Quaid "Cousin Eddie" character. The second film is the 2015 Vacation.

In the opening "Pig in a Poke" sequence as well as the closing credits, the family's name is spelled as "Griswald" as opposed to "Griswold". Clark's passport during the opening credits also shows his last name as Griswald.

National Lampoon's Christmas Vacation (1989)

National Lampoon's Christmas Vacation was directed by Jeremiah S. Chechik and written by John Hughes. The film follows Clark's attempt at delivering "the most fun-filled old-fashioned family Christmas ever". As Clark's parents, aunt, and uncle, Ellen's parents, and Catherine and Eddie's family begin arriving early, he becomes obsessed with ensuring that everything goes right. Meanwhile, he is also expecting a large Christmas bonus check from Frank Shirley that will cover a surprise backyard swimming pool that he already ordered. However, when the Christmas bonuses are cut, he instead receives a one-year membership to the Jelly of the Month Club, causing him to snap and go crazy.

The film's success resulted in a sequel, National Lampoon's Christmas Vacation 2, centered on Eddie's family.

Vegas Vacation (1997)

Vegas Vacation was directed by Stephen Kessler and written by Elisa Bell, based on a story by Bell and Bob Ducsay. After receiving a large bonus check from Frank Shirley for the success of one of the preservatives that he worked on, Clark takes his family on vacation to Las Vegas. Immediately hitting the blackjack tables, he begins to blow all his money, resulting in them breaking off in their own directions. While he tries to regain his money through the help of his cousin-in-law Eddie, Ellen becomes infatuated with Wayne Newton as Rusty wins big at the dice tables and Audrey turns to go-go dancing with her cousin Vicki. The film is notable for being the first (and to date, only) installment to receive a PG rating from the MPAA and the first to be made without the involvement of John Hughes.

Vacation (2015)

Vacation is a 2015 theatrical installment of the series written and directed by John Francis Daley and Jonathan Goldstein. Following in Clark's footsteps, a grown-up Rusty Griswold (Ed Helms) surprises his wife, Debbie (Christina Applegate), and their two sons James (Skyler Gisondo) and Kevin (Steele Stebbins) with a cross-country road trip back to Walley World, in an effort to recreate the family vacations he had with his parents and sister (Leslie Mann). It is the first entry since the original to receive an R rating.

Spin-off

National Lampoon's Christmas Vacation 2 (2003)

National Lampoon's Christmas Vacation 2: Cousin Eddie's Island Adventure is a made-for-TV spin-off film directed by Nick Marck and written by Matty Simmons. After a workplace accident involving a chimpanzee, Eddie Johnson is given a free vacation for him and his family to an island in the South Pacific by his boss Professor Doornitz to avoid a potential lawsuit from Eddie. But when he tries to catch a shark during a family boat trip, they become lost and eventually shipwrecked on an isolated island.

It can be considered a sequel to National Lampoon's Christmas Vacation, although it is more of a spin-off than a direct chapter in the Vacation series, because Chevy Chase and Beverly D'Angelo do not appear. It stars Randy Quaid and Miriam Flynn, reprising their roles as Cousin Eddie and Catherine, with Dana Barron returning as Audrey Griswold. Ed Asner appears as Eddie's uncle Nick.

Short film

Hotel Hell Vacation (2010) 

Hotel Hell Vacation is a short film directed by Bryan Buckley. On their way to visit Rusty and his family at a vacation rental, Clark and Ellen decide to have a romantic getaway at a hotel before they get there. Everything goes wrong and they hastily make their way to Rusty's rental.

The film was a campaign ad for HomeAway that originally aired in part during the broadcast of Super Bowl XLIV and in entirety on Homeaway.com. While it was sanctioned by Warner Bros., it was not sponsored by the National Lampoon label.

Television

The Griswolds (2023)
In December 2019, a television spin-off series entitled The Griswolds entered development. The series is set to be aired on HBO Max, though it has not been officially picked up, with former Rusty actor Johnny Galecki serving as executive producer. As of 2023, no recent update has been given on the project.

Cast and crew

Principal cast
 A  indicates the actor portrayed the role of a younger version of the character.
 A  indicates the actor or actress lent only his or her voice for his or her film character.
 A dark gray cell indicates the character was not in the film.

Additional crew

Production

Development
After the success of National Lampoon's Animal House in 1978, it was decided that another story from the National Lampoon magazine should be adapted into a film. One of such stories chosen for development was John Hughes' "Vacation '58" that was originally published in the September 1979 issue of National Lampoon. Hughes wrote the screenplay for the first Vacation film as "a fairly straight adaptation of the short story", with the exception of the ending that was rewritten and reshot after being "thoroughly despised by preview audiences". In addition to Hughes, Vacation involved the crew of many people connected to National Lampoon. The film was produced by Lampoon co-founder and Animal House producer, Matty Simmons, and directed by Lampoon alumnus and Animal House co-writer Harold Ramis.

Released on July 29, 1983, National Lampoon's Vacation proved to be a financial and critical success. Simmons went on to produce two sequels, with scripts by Hughes. While involved with the early stages of a third sequel, Vegas Vacation, Simmons resigned from production due to creative differences. As a result, the film was made without the "National Lampoon" title.

During an interview on the TBS series Dinner and a Movie, Beverly D'Angelo revealed that due to the success of Animal House, the original Vacation was envisioned as a raunchier R-rated comedy targeting young adults. This was principally the reason for nudity such as D'Angelo's shower scene, and Chase's profanity-laced tirades and pool scene with Christie Brinkley. However, the movie's success with larger family audiences who identified with Chase's everyman-father character caught the filmmakers by surprise. As a result, the subsequent sequels prior to the 2015 R-rated revival were toned down and family friendly, with PG-13 or PG ratings.

Casting
Along with John Belushi, who starred in Animal House, Chevy Chase had previously performed in The National Lampoon Radio Hour and in the stage show National Lampoon Lemmings, both of which were spin-offs from National Lampoon magazine.

In each of the main films of the series, the Griswold children are portrayed by different actors. This is usually attributed to the fact that after Anthony Michael Hall declined to reprise his role in European Vacation in order to star in Weird Science, director Amy Heckerling requested both children be recast. Chase has indicated that it was his idea to continue recasting the children by explaining: "I always wanted to make the joke, 'Geez, I hardly ever get the chance to see the kids anymore. I hardly know who they are. We should go on a vacation'. That was funny to me: the idea that Clark was such a great family man, but still didn't even recognize his own children".

Unproduced scripts
Shortly after making European Vacation, Chase and Eric Idle began to write a script for a follow up called National Lampoon's Australian Vacation. According to Idle: "We spent some time working together on it. It had some nice shark gags, but I can't pretend it was in any way finished". The concept of Australian Vacation resurfaced in the 90s as a potential fifth installment of the series, but nothing ever came of it.

Prior to the confirmed plans of New Line Cinema rebooting the series, Chase made note that he has developed another sequel tentatively titled Swiss Family Griswold. In 2011, Chase revealed that he and Beverly D'Angelo have been working on the idea: "There's a cruise, there's a fire on the ship, we think the whole ship's on fire and we jump —- it's just a little fire —- and we end up on an island where we meet Randy somewhere who's been left there from an old Survivor series".

Remake turned sequel
New Line Cinema (owned by Warner Bros., which released the previous films) confirmed a new Vacation film in 2010. The film, titled simply Vacation, was ultimately released on July 29, 2015, exactly 32 years after the original film was released into theaters. It was produced by David Dobkin and written by John Francis Daley and Jonathan Goldstein.

The film is a direct sequel to the previous films (picking up years after the events of Vegas Vacation), starring Ed Helms as Rusty Griswold, as he takes his own family to Walley World. Leslie Mann appeared as Audrey Griswold. Original series stars D'Angelo and Chase appeared in cameo roles. The film also starred Chris Hemsworth, Charlie Day and Christina Applegate.

Continuity and recurring elements

The Griswold children

Aside from the obvious issues with the characters' physical appearances due to being played by different actors, Rusty and Audrey both age on a floating timeline. It is assumed that each film takes place in the year they are actually filmed, as no other indication of time is mentioned and the characters' clothing, cars, and environment are contemporary to the time of each film's release. In most of the films it is never mentioned which of the two children is older. Rusty and Audrey appear to be in their early teens in Vacation (1983), and in their mid-teens in European Vacation (1985) two years later (at one point in the film, he specifically mentions that he is fifteen years old). However, in Christmas Vacation (1989), while she appears to be in her late teens, he looks younger than he did in the preceding films. In Vegas Vacation (1997), both are in their late teens to which Clark tells the kids, "I hardly recognize you anymore!" The next shot freezes for a moment on the kids sitting silently, making fun of the discontinuity.

Dana Barron, who was then in her late thirties, reprised the role of Audrey in Christmas Vacation 2 (2003). Rusty is also portrayed as an adult with a wife and daughter in Hotel Hell Vacation (2010). However, in Vacation (2015), Rusty is portrayed by Ed Helms and has two sons with no mention of a daughter.

The Girl in the Red Ferrari
In the first Vacation film, Clark sees a golden-haired beauty driving a red Ferrari played by model and actress Christie Brinkley. Clark later encounters her at a hotel, with her attempts to seduce him resulting in an embarrassing failure on his behalf. In Vegas Vacation, Clark once again drives alongside the same woman (again played by Brinkley) when en route to Eddie and Catherine's current location, mouthing the question "remember me?" After she responds that she does, Clark spots a baby in the backseat of her car, clearly indicating she's now a mom and possibly married — much to Clark's disappointment where she just shrugs her shoulders when Clark mouths a question.

A new girl in a red Ferrari played by model Hannah Davis appears in the 2015 Vacation. This time, while driving down the highway, the girl pulls alongside Rusty and makes flirtatious gestures at him before swerving into the other lane, being hit head on and killed by a semi-truck.

Eddie and Catherine Johnson
Eddie and Catherine are seen with the following children in their respective films: Vicky, Dale, Daisy Mable, Eddie Jr, and Junior (Vacation); Rocky and Ruby Sue (Christmas Vacation); Denny (Vegas Vacation); and Clark "Third" Johnson — the namesake of Clark Griswold (Christmas Vacation 2). In addition to those seen, several others are mentioned or alluded to throughout the series. While the Johnsons do not appear in the 2015 Vacation, Eddie is mentioned once. Since Clark refers to Eddie as his cousin-in-law in Christmas Vacation, hence generally being referred to as 'Cousin Eddie' - it's presumed that Catherine is a cousin of Ellen. This is confirmed in Vegas Vacation when Ellen directly asks Clark how often she gets to see her "cousin", Catherine.

Walley World
Walley World is mentioned in subsequent films following Vacation:

 In European Vacation, Clark tells his wife and children to be open-minded and respectful of other countries' cultures, reminding them "This isn't Walley World, it's a country". Clark and Rusty also wear Walley World sweaters at certain points in the film.
 In Christmas Vacation, Clark and Eddie can be seen drinking eggnog out of glasses shaped like Marty Moose's head (with the cartoonish oversized antlers serving as handles).
 In Hotel Hell Vacation, Rusty can be seen wearing a Marty Moose T-shirt.
 Walley World once again makes an appearance in the 2015 Vacation. In the film, the park appears to be updated with new attractions and modernized signage, including a statue of Marty Moose taking a selfie.

Clark's tirades
Clark is usually very easy-going and optimistic, even in the face of adversity and his family's seeming lack of appreciation for his efforts on their behalf. However, when he is pushed beyond the limit of his patience, he tends to lose his temper and go on furious tirades, as seen in the first Vacation, where he scolds his family for not wanting to continue the trip and again after finding that Walley World is closed for repairs. In Christmas Vacation, Clark went into a tirade against his boss Frank Shirley not giving him a Christmas bonus, angry at his relatives because of their wanting to leave following the squirrel incident, and rants to Frank about him cutting the Christmas bonuses.

"This is our first..."
Ellen has a tendency to mention about her family's first action in some films. In Vacation, Clark pulled a BB gun on Russ Laskey where Ellen mentions "We're not violent people, this is our first gun!" Clark then quotes "No it's not"! In Christmas Vacation, Eddie actually abducts Frank Shirley from his house on Melody Lane and brings him to the Griswald household with a ribbon on his head and a dog chain on his wrist and ankles where he rants that he had never been treated like this in his life. Ellen then quotes "I'm sorry, this is our family's first kidnapping!"

Reception

Box office performance
When released in 1983, National Lampoon's Vacation was a significant box-office hit. The film earned over $61 million in the United States with an estimated budget of $15 million.

Without being adjusted for inflation, the profit earned by the individual Vacation films follow behind National Lampoon's Animal House as the highest-grossing films of the National Lampoon brand.

Critical and public response

Legacy
In 2000, readers of Total Film magazine voted National Lampoon's Vacation as the 46th greatest comedy film of all time. The film was also nominated for AFI's 100 Years...100 Laughs list in 2000.  Christmas Vacation has additionally become a television staple, especially during the holiday season, as it has often been labeled as a contemporary Christmas classic.

Other media

Old Navy ad campaign (2012) 
In November and December 2012, series regulars Chevy Chase and Beverly D'Angelo were featured in a set of commercials for Old Navy. Joining them in one commercial were Juliette Lewis (from Christmas Vacation), Dana Barron and Anthony Michael Hall (from Vacation), and Jason Lively (from European Vacation); that spot featured three Rustys and three Audreys (including a "new Rusty" and a "new Audrey", both of whom were children).

Ford Mustang ad campaign (2020) 
In 2020, Chevy Chase and Beverly D'Angelo reprised their roles as Clark and Ellen in a Ford commercial for the Ford Mustang Mach-E. The commercial spoofed the house lighting scene.

The Goldbergs
Christie Brinkley reprised her role as the Girl in the Red Ferrari, while Anthony Michael Hall played a theme park security guard in the seventh season of the television series The Goldbergs.

Other appearances
In the Family Guy episode "Boys Do Cry", there is a scene where a woman is driving next to Peter and gets hit by a truck, which mimics the Christie Brinkley car scene from the first Vacation; Lois responds "Eh, you marry Billy Joel, it's gonna happen one way or another". In "Blue Harvest", the Griswold Family is seen driving past the Death Star during the battle at the end. Chevy Chase and Beverly D'Angelo reprise their roles here.

In 2008, Christie Brinkley spoofed her role as "The Girl in the Red Ferrari" in a DirecTV commercial that recreated the swimming pool scene from Vacation by inter-splicing footage from the original film.

In 2015, Christie Brinkley reprised her role as "The Girl in the Red Ferrari" as the mom in an Infiniti QX60 TV spot, in which she comments about another blonde beauty driving by in a red convertible. Ethan Embry, who played Rusty in the 1997 Vegas Vacation, plays the dad.

In popular culture
On December 25, 2014, in Clark, NJ, signs for the Garden State Parkway Exit 135 were vandalized from "Clark and Westfield" to "Clark Griswold", making national news headlines. 

Australian hip hop artists, Hilltop Hoods issued a single "Clark Griswold" (July 2018) featuring Adrian Eagle, which reached the Australian Singles Chart top 50, and won the ARIA Award for Best Urban Release in 2018.

See also
 List of National Lampoon films

References

External links
 "Vacation '58" by John Hughes reprinted by The Hollywood Reporter
 "Christmas '59" by John Hughes at ClarkGriswoldCollection.com

 
Warner Bros. Pictures franchises
Comedy film series
American film series
Films about vacationing
Film series introduced in 1983